Slobodan "Piva" Ivković (4 August 1937 – 28 November 1995) was a Serbian professional basketball player and coach.

Playing career
Ivković played club basketball at the senior level in the club Radnički Belgrade. He was a well-talented player with much better physical capabilities, but nobody managed to stabilize him as a player. Besides that, he had weak sight, which was a serious problem since in those times many games were played outside, during the night.

Coaching career
Ivković was one of the first Serbian coaches that went to school in the USA. He was the founder of the creation of a modern coach organization in the former Yugoslavia. He coached in the following clubs: Radnički Belgrade, OKK Belgrade, MZT Skopje, Kazma (Kuwait), and Al Ahli (United Arab Emirates).

Personal life
His younger brother Dušan was a former basketball player and FIBA Hall of Fame coach.

Ivković is related to the famous Serbian scientist Nikola Tesla. Ivković's maternal grandmother Olga Mandić and Tesla were first cousins.

A memorial tournament named after him is held in Belgrade. The organizer is the basketball club Radnički.

Career achievements
Head coach
 Yugoslav League: 1 (with Radnički Belgrade: 1972–73)
 Yugoslav Cup: 1 (with Radnički Belgrade: 1975–76)
 FIBA European Champions Cup – semifinalist (with Radnički Belgrade: 1973–74)

See also 
 Slobodan Piva Ivković Award for Lifetime Achievement

References

External links
Zvonimir Matutinović: Slobodan Piva Ivković
 About Piva Ivković

1937 births
1995 deaths
Basketball players from Belgrade
OKK Beograd coaches
BKK Radnički coaches
BKK Radnički players
Burials at Belgrade New Cemetery
Serbian men's basketball players
Serbian men's basketball coaches
Yugoslav men's basketball players
Yugoslav basketball coaches
Serbian expatriate basketball people in Kuwait
Serbian expatriate basketball people in the United Arab Emirates
Serbian expatriate basketball people in North Macedonia